The Source Presents: Hip Hop Hits, Volume 3 is the third annual music compilation album to be contributed by The Source magazine.  Released November 30, 1999 and distributed by Def Jam Recordings, Hip Hop Hits Volume 3 features seventeen hip hop and rap hits. It went to number 29 on the Top R&B/Hip Hop Albums chart and peaked at number 45 on the Billboard 200 album chart.

This is the second album in Hip Hop Hits series that does not feature an R&B/Hip Hop or a pop hit in the number-one position, but two tracks, "Jamboree" and "Who Dat" reached number one on the Hot Rap Tracks chart.

Track listing
 Holla Holla - Ja Rule
 Quiet Storm - Mobb Deep
 Hate Me Now - Nas (Feat. P. Diddy)
 Tommy's Theme - Made Men (Feat. The LOX)
 Watch Out Now - The Beatnuts
 Ha [Remix] - Juvenile (Feat. Jay-Z)
 Watch Out for the Hook (Dungeon Family Mix) - Cool Breeze (Feat. Goodie Mob, OutKast & Witchdoctor)
 Slippin' - DMX
 Hard Knock Life (Ghetto Anthem) - Jay-Z
 Guilty Conscience - Eminem (Feat. Dr. Dre)
 Tear It Off - Method Man (Feat. Redman)
 Who Dat - JT Money (Feat. Solé)
 Nann Nigga - Trick Daddy (Feat. Trina)
 Simon Says - Pharoahe Monch
 What Ya Want - Eve (Feat. Nokio the N-Tity & Ruff Ryders)
 Jamboree - Naughty by Nature (Feat. Zhané)
 Hoody Hooo - TRU

References

Hip hop compilation albums
1999 compilation albums